Operation Trust (Russian: операция "Трест", tr. Operatsiya "Trest") was a counterintelligence operation of the State Political Directorate (GPU) of the Soviet Union.  The operation, which was set up by GPU's predecessor Cheka, ran from 1921 to 1926, set up a fake anti-Bolshevik resistance organization, "Monarchist Union of Central Russia", MUCR (Монархическое объединение Центральной России, МОЦР), in order to help the OGPU identify real monarchists and anti-Bolsheviks. The created front company was called the Moscow Municipal Credit Association.

The head of the MUCR was Alexander Yakushev (Александр Александрович Якушев), a former bureaucrat of the Ministry of Communications of Imperial Russia, who after the Russian Revolution joined the  Narkomat of External Trade (Наркомат внешней торговли), when the Soviets began to allow the former specialists (called "spetsy") to resume the positions of their expertise. This position allowed him to travel abroad and contact Russian emigrants. Yakushev was arrested for his contacts with the exiled White movement. In the same year of his arrest, he was recruited in the Soviet secret police by Artur Artuzov.

MUCR kept the monarchist general Alexander Kutepov (Александр Кутепов) from active actions, as he was convinced to wait for the development of internal anti-Bolshevik forces.  Kutepov had previously believed in militant action as a solution to the Soviet occupation, and had formed the "combat organization", a militant splinter from the Russian All-Military Union (Russkiy ObshcheVoinskiy Soyuz) led by General Baron Pyotr Nikolayevich Wrangel. Kutepov also created the Inner Line as a counter-intelligence organization to prevent Bolshevik penetrations.  It caused the Cheka some problems but was not overly successful.

Among the successes of Trust was the luring of Boris Savinkov and Sidney Reilly into the Soviet Union, where they were captured.

The Soviets did not organize Trust from scratch. The White Army had left sleeper agents, and there were also Royalist Russians who did not leave after the Civil War. These people cooperated to the point of having a loose organizational structure. When the OGPU discovered them, they did not liquidate all of them, but manoeuvred into creating a shell organization for their own use.

Still another episode of the operation was an "illegal" trip (in fact, monitored by OGPU) of a notable émigré, Vasily Shulgin, into the Soviet Union. After his return he published a book "Three Capitals" with his impressions. In the book he wrote, in part, that contrary to his expectations, Russia was reviving, and the Bolsheviks would probably be removed from power.

In 1993, a Western historian who was granted limited access to the Trust files, John Costello, reported that they comprised thirty-seven volumes and were such a bewildering welter of double-agents, changed code names, and interlocking deception operations with "the complexity of a symphonic score" that Russian historians from the Intelligence Service had difficulty separating fact from fantasy. The book in which this was written, was co-authored by ex-KGB spokesman Oleg Tsarev.

Defector Vasili Mitrokhin reported that the Trust files were not housed at the SVR offices in Yasenevo, but were kept in the special archival collections (spetsfondi) of the FSB at the Lubyanka.

In 1967 a Soviet adventure TV series Operation Trust (Операция "Трест") was created.

In the 1920s and 1930s, the Soviet Union also pursued multiple "Trest-like" deception operations in East Asia, including "Organizator", "Shogun", "Dreamers" and "Maki Mirage" all against Japan. Like "Trest", they involved the control of fake anti-Soviet operations to lure rivals.

See also 
 Active Measures
 False flag operations
Honeypot (computing)
Hundred Flowers Campaign, China
Inner Line
Political warfare
Roman Malinovsky
Syndicate–2
Tagantsev conspiracy

References

Sources 
Christopher Andrew and Vasili Mitrokhin, The Mitrokhin Archive: The KGB in Europe and the West, Gardners Books (2000), 
Costello, John and Oleg Tsarev, Deadly Illusions: The KGB Orlov Dossier Reveals Stalin's Master Spy, Crown Publishing, 1993. 
Richard B. Spence Trust no One: The Secret World of Sidney Reilly, Feral House publ., 2003,  
Gordon Brook-Shepherd Iron Maze. The Western Secret Services and the Bolsheviks, Macmillan, 1998
Pamela K. Simpkins and K. Leigh Dyer, The Trust, The Security and Intelligence Foundation Reprint Series, July 1989.

False flag operations
Military history of the Soviet Union
White Russian emigration
Soviet Union intelligence operations
1920s in the Soviet Union